Natalya Yevdokimova (born 17 March 1978) is a Russian middle-distance runner who specializes in the 1500 metres. Having run her first sub-four-minute 1500 m, she was selected for the 2004 Olympic Games where she finished fourth in the women's 1500 metres.

She was eighth at the 2004 IAAF World Athletics Final, but improved to win a bronze medal at the competition the following year. After a long period away from top-level competition, she returned for the 2009 European Athletics Indoor Championships, where she finished in sixth place. Although she went on to compete at the 2009 World Championships in Athletics finishing in eighth in the women's 1500 m final, that result was subsequently disqualified due to a doping ruling

On 22 June 2017, the Court of Arbitration for Sport decided that Yevdokimova had engaged in blood doping practices and issued her with a four ban from competition commencing on 14 April 2016 along with an order than all her results between 17 August 2009 and 20 May 2012 be disqualified.

Personal bests
800 metres - 2:02.78 min (2004)
1500 metres outdoors - 4:07.72 min (2009)
1500 metres indoors- 3:57.73 min (2005)
One mile - 4:29.29 min (2003)

International competitions

References

External links



1978 births
Living people
Russian female middle-distance runners
Ukrainian female middle-distance runners
Olympic female middle-distance runners
Olympic athletes of Russia
Athletes (track and field) at the 2004 Summer Olympics
World Athletics Championships athletes for Russia
Russian Athletics Championships winners
Doping cases in athletics
Russian sportspeople in doping cases